Redhead is a 1934 American drama film directed by Melville Brown and starring Bruce Cabot, Grace Bradley, and Regis Toomey. It was released on November 1, 1934.

Cast list
 Bruce Cabot as Ted Brown
 Grace Bradley as Dale Carter
 Regis Toomey as Scoop
 Berton Churchill as Mr. Brown
 LeRoy Mason as Pretty Boy
 Monte Carter as Donterini
 George Humbert as Pasquale
 Rita Campagna as Mrs. Pasquale
 Ed Brady as Joe
 Bess Stafford as Landlady

See also
 Redhead (1941 film)

References

External links 
 
 
 

American drama films
1934 drama films
1934 films
American black-and-white films
Films directed by Melville W. Brown
Monogram Pictures films
1930s American films